Jerome Baker (born December 25, 1996) is an American football linebacker for the Miami Dolphins of the National Football League (NFL). He played college football at Ohio State.

Early years
Baker attended Benedictine High School in Cleveland, Ohio. He was a member of the 2014 State Championship football team while at Benedictine and was considered the #2 recruit in the state of Ohio for the class of 2015. He originally committed to the University of Florida to play college football but changed his commitment to Ohio State University.

College career
Baker played at Ohio State from 2015 to 2017. After his junior season in 2017, he decided to forgo his senior year and enter the 2018 NFL Draft. During his career, he had 159 tackles, seven sacks, and two interceptions.

Professional career
On January 8, 2018, Baker released a statement on his Twitter account announcing his decision to forgo his remaining eligibility and enter the 2018 NFL Draft. Baker attended the NFL Scouting Combine and completed the majority of combine drills, but opted to skip the short shuttle and three-cone drill. On March 22, 2018, he participated at Ohio State's pro day and performed the short shuttle, three-cone drill, and positional drills. Baker attended pre-draft visits with the Denver Broncos, San Francisco 49ers, and Jacksonville Jaguars. After the pre-draft process, Baker was projected to be a third or fourth-round pick by NFL draft experts and scouts. He was ranked the seventh-best linebacker in the draft by Sports Illustrated, was ranked the seventh-best outside linebacker by Scouts Inc., and was ranked the 12th best outside linebacker by DraftScout.com.

The Miami Dolphins selected Baker in the third round with the 73rd overall pick in the 2018 NFL Draft. Baker was the 10th linebacker drafted in 2018. He was reunited with former Ohio State teammate Raekwon McMillan.

2018
On June 2, 2018, the Miami Dolphins signed Baker to a four-year, $3.80 million contract that includes a signing bonus of $975,200. Throughout training camp, Baker competed to be the starting strongside linebacker after the role was left vacant by the departure of Lawrence Timmons. Baker competed against Mike Hull, Stephone Anthony, Chase Allen, and Quentin Poling. Head coach Adam Gase named Baker and Kiko Alonso the starting outside linebackers to begin the regular season. They started alongside middle linebacker Raekwon McMillan.

He made his professional regular-season debut and the first career start in the Miami Dolphins’ season-opener against the Tennessee Titans and made six combined tackles during their 27–20 victory. In Week 4, he collected a season-high ten combined tackles (six solos) as the Dolphins list 38–7 at the New England Patriots. The following week, he recorded seven combined tackles and made two sacks during a 27–17 loss at the Cincinnati Bengals in Week 5. On November 4, 2018, Baker made five combined tackles, a pass deflection, and made his first career interception during the Dolphins’ 13–6 win against the New York Jets in Week 9. He finished his rookie season in 2018 with 79 combined tackles (57 solos), three pass deflections, three sacks, one interception, and one touchdown in 16 games and 11 stars. Baker earned an overall grade of 70.3 from Pro Football Focus, which ranked as the 29th best grade among all qualified linebackers in 2018.

2019
In Week 2 against the New England Patriots, Baker recorded a team high 12 tackles as the Dolphins lost 43–0. In Week 10 against the Indianapolis Colts, Baker recorded a team high eight tackles and one sack on Brian Hoyer in the 16–12 win. In Week 15 against the New York Giants, Baker recorded a team high 12 tackles and intercepted a pass thrown by Eli Manning during the 36–20 loss. He finished the 2019 season with 126 tackles, four passes defensed, two forced fumbles, 1.5 sacks, and one interception.

2020
Baker was placed on the reserve/COVID-19 list by the Dolphins on July 31, 2020, and activated from the list three days later.

In Week 1 against the New England Patriots, Baker recorded a team high 16 tackles (12 solo), sacked quarterback Cam Newton once, and forced wide receiver N'Keal Harry to fumble the football in the endzone for a touchback during the 21–11 loss.
In Week 14 against the Kansas City Chiefs, Baker led the team with 9 tackles and sacked Patrick Mahomes 2.5 times during the 33–27 loss.  One of Baker's sacks on Mahomes resulted in a loss of 30 yards.

2021
Baker signed a three-year, $39 million contract extension with the Dolphins on June 13, 2021.

References

External links
Miami Dolphins bio
Ohio State Buckeyes bio

1996 births
Living people
Players of American football from Cleveland
American football linebackers
Ohio State Buckeyes football players
Miami Dolphins players